Asia Muhammad and Maria Sanchez were the defending champions, but chose not to participate.

Olga Govortsova and Mandy Minella won the title, defeating Sophie Chang and Alexandra Mueller in the final, 6–3, 6–4.

Seeds

Draw

Draw

References
Main Draw

Henderson Tennis Open - Doubles